Raleigh Springs Civic Center is a 65 multi-acre civic center that is located in Memphis, Tennessee, United States. The property is owned by the Memphis City Council, and was constructed on the site of the former Raleigh Springs Mall.

History 
The Raleigh Springs Civic Center was under construction on the site of the previous Raleigh Springs Mall in 2018, until the construction was completed with the civic center in fall 2020. The Raleigh Springs Civic Center houses the Memphis Police Department Old Allen Precinct, Union Avenue Traffic Division, and the Raleigh Library.

The site features a pond with a scenic walking trail that is open to the public. A skate park on site is also open to the public. The Raleigh Library features an observation deck overlooking the 11-acre pond. It is designed by OT Marshall Architects. The road "Morrison Drive" leading into the civic center is named for Bill Morrison, a member of the Memphis City Council, representing District 1, from 2008 to 2018 and who championed the project.

The civic center was "unofficially" opened in the spring of 2020. The official ribbon cutting occurred on November 19, 2020. The virtual "ribbon cutting" ceremony was live streamed for the community by The City of Memphis, with limited number of invitees due to the ongoing COVID-19 pandemic in Tennessee.

Formation 
After the demolition of the former Raleigh Springs Mall, the groundbreaking of the new Raleigh Springs Civic Center started around December 2017. It would have been known as the "Raleigh Springs Town Center", but residents came up with a different name due to unknown reasons. In March 2018, the construction had begun with the new civic center.

Issues 
As of July 2020, Construction was slowed down at the Raleigh Springs Civic Center with the new Raleigh Library, due to the COVID-19 pandemic, before the ribbon cutting ceremony was held on November 19, 2020. Due to covid19 restrictions, the ribbon-cutting was only attended by invited local dignitaries; however, it was live-streamed by the City of Memphis Housing and Community Development Office. Mayor Jim Stickland attended and introduced the new street name, Morrison Drive, in honor of Clerk Bill Morrison of Memphis, TN.

Artwork 
The Great Wall of Raleigh mural is still under creation, featuring mural art from local artists. The Great Wall of Raleigh runs behind the Raleigh Springs Civic Center. Works by local artists are also placed along the walking trail that borders the retention pond, inside the library and the police precinct.

Gallery

References 

Government buildings in the United States
Memphis, Tennessee
Office buildings in Memphis, Tennessee
2020 establishments in Tennessee